is a Japanese television jidaigeki or period drama that was broadcast in 1987. It is the 27th in the Hissatsu series.

Cast 
 Makoto Fujita as Mondo Nakamura
 Hiroaki Murakami as Masa
 Hide Demon as Yotsuru no Ginppie
 Kazuko Kato as Benriya Otama
 Ippie Hikaru as Junnosuke Nishi
 Ken Nishida as Yoriki Onizuka
 Toshio Yamauchi as Tanaka sama
 Kin Sugai as Sen Nakamura
 Mari Shiraki as Ritsu Nakamura

References

1986 Japanese television series debuts
1980s drama television series
Jidaigeki television series